The Vila Real Football Association (Associação de Futebol de Vila Real, abrv. AF Vila Real) is the district governing body for all football competitions in the Portuguese district of Vila Real. It is also the regulator of the clubs registered in the district.

Notable clubs in the Vila Real FA
 G.D. Chaves
 Vila Real

Current Divisions - 2011–12 Season
The AF Vila Real runs the following divisions covering the fifth and sixth tiers of the Portuguese football league system.

Honra – série A

Centro Desportivo e Cultural de Montalegre
Grupo Desportivo de Boticas
Grupo Desportivo de Cerva
Grupo Desportivo de Ribeira de Pena
Grupo Desportivo de Valpaços
Grupo Desportivo de Vilar de Perdizes
Grupo Desportivo e Cultural de Salto
Mondinense Futebol Clube
Vidago Futebol Clube
Vilarinho Futebol Clube

Honra – série B

Abambres Sport Clube
Associação Desportiva e Cultural de Santa Marta de Penaguião
Associação Desportiva e Cultural Fernão Magalhães
Atlético Clube Alijoense
Centro Cultural Noura
Futebol Clube de Fontelas
Juventude de Pedras Salgadas  - Associação Cultural, Desportiva e Recreativa
Sabroso Sport Clube
Sport Clube da Régua
Sport Clube de Mesão Frio

See also
Portuguese District Football Associations
Portuguese football competitions
List of football clubs in Portugal

References 

Vila Real